Nansledan is a major new suburb of Newquay in Cornwall, England. Nansledan has been developed by the estate of the Duchy of Cornwall since 2013, with residents first occupying their homes in 2015. The development, officially described as 'an extension of Newquay', had the endorsement of King Charles III during his time as Duke of Cornwall.

Nansledan is expected to have up to 4,400 homes eventually.

History
The project was started in 2013 and initially attracted the nickname Surfbury, a mix of Poundbury, created by the Duchy of Cornwall in the 1990s, and the fact that Newquay is regarded as the British 'capital' of surfing. The development was named Nansledan, inspired by the area in which it is built. Nansledan means Broad Valley in Cornish, a theme which continues in the street names and the school (Skol Nansledan - which means School Nansledan.)

Nansledan will have a Market Street with shops, while Nansledan school opened in September 2019 It will cater for 420 pupils, and had 152 when it opened.

Building materials have come mainly from three Cornish quarries;
 slate has come from Trelivett Quarry near Tintagel, 
 granite, which is used in kerbs, paving, lintels and window sills from De Lank Quarry at Bodmin
 roofing slate has come from Delabole Quarry

The first residents moved into Nansledan in 2015.

Notes

References

External links
Duchy of Cornwall Nansledan website
School website
New Classical architecture
Charles III